Pauline Grace Maguy Ducruet (born 4 May 1994) is a Monegasque diver, designer and niece of Prince Albert II of Monaco, through her mother, Princess Stéphanie of Monaco.

Early life
Ducruet was born on 4 May 1994 at Princess Grace Hospital Centre in La Colle, Monaco. She is the second child of Princess Stéphanie of Monaco and Daniel Ducruet. Her parents subsequently married in a civil ceremony on 1 July 1995. She has an older brother (Louis) and three half-siblings. Her half-brother Michael is the son of Daniel Ducruet and Martine Malbouvier. Her half-sister, Camille Gottlieb, is the daughter of Princess Stéphanie and Jean-Raymond Gottlieb. Her other half-sister, Linoué Ducruet, is the daughter of Daniel Ducruet and Kelly Marie Carla Lancien.

Education
Ducruet received a baccalaureate, literary section, from Lycée Prince Albert I de Monaco. Ducruet is said to have skipped a year in school, making her a year behind her brother, rather than two years behind. She received her French Baccalauréat degree in July 2011. In 2012, she studied at Monaco's language school.

Career
For three years, Ducruet was a stylist apprentice at the Instituto Marangoni in Paris. In 2015, Ducruet went to study fashion design in New York; part of her studies were a five-month internship at Vogue and a six-month internship at Louis Vuitton. She received an associate degree in Fashion Design from Parsons The New School for Design 2015–2017.

In June 2017, Ducruet partnered with Maria Zarco in the launch of Altered Designs, a fashion company the two women publicize via Instagram.

Diving
Ducruet is a competitive diver. In 2010, she represented Monaco at the World Junior Diving Championships in Aachen, Germany, and in July 2010, she competed in the European Junior Swimming and Diving Championships in Helsinki, Finland. In August 2010, she was part of the Monaco delegation at the 2010 Summer Youth Olympics in Singapore.

Competitive results
6th in 1-meter springboard at the international meeting in Eindhoven, The Netherlands
5th in the 1-meter springboard championships in France Winter Youth in Angers, France
2nd jumps of 1 and 3-meter championships in France Youth Summer School in Strasbourg
19th and 22nd at the European Championships in Helsinki
a finalist in the 3-meter springboard in the 1st Youth Olympics in Singapore. (final result: 12th place of 13 divers)
18th FINA Junior Diving World Championships
Group A Girls 1m (16–18) – (Prelim/Quarterfinal) 21  
 Group A Girls 3m (16–18) – (Prelim/Quarterfinal) 29

On 5 November 2010, Ducruet was nominated as "Sportsperson of the year" for the 2009–2010 season.

Other interests
Ducruet's earliest activities include the training of elephants in the circus of Franco Knie. In 2004, she was involved in gymnastics; her mother is president of Monaco's gymnastics federation.

As of December 2011, according to Princess Stephanie, Pauline was assisting her with all aspects of the 2012 International Circus Festival of Monte-Carlo. She also founded and presides over the jury of the "New Generation" circus festival in Monaco, specifically for people under 20 years of age.

Succession
Ducruet is a niece of Prince Albert II of Monaco, and is currently 16th in the line of succession to the Monegasque throne.

References

House of Grimaldi
Monegasque Roman Catholics
1994 births
Living people
Divers at the 2010 Summer Youth Olympics
Kelly family
Fashion influencers
Monegasque people of Irish descent
Monegasque people of American descent
Monegasque sportswomen
Monegasque female divers
Monegasque people of Italian descent
Monegasque people of Mexican descent
Monegasque people of Scottish descent
Monegasque people of German descent
Monegasque people of English descent
Monegasque bloggers
Monegasque women bloggers
Monegasque women writers